The Croatian football league system is a series of connected leagues for club football in Croatia. This system has hierarchical format with promotion and relegation between leagues at different levels. Last revision of league system was made in 2022:

Men's league system
Update: 19 September 2022

Evolution of the Croatian league system

Women's league system
Update: 19 September 2022

Group A consist of counties in central, south and west Croatia. Group B consist of counties in east and north Croatia.

Futsal league system
Update: 5 December 2022

Prva HMNLŽ (women futsal league) has 6 clubs and at this moment is only women's futsal league in country.

External links 
 League321.com – Croatian football league tables, records & statistics database. 
 RSSSF.com – Croatian football league tables and results 2015–16.

References 

 
Croatia